Barriopsis is genus of fungus first described in 2008.

References

Further reading
Abdollahzadeh, Jafar, Rasoul Zare, and Alan JL Phillips. "Phylogeny and taxonomy of Botryosphaeria and Neofusicoccum species in Iran, with description of Botryosphaeria scharifii sp. nov." Mycologia 105.1 (2013): 210–220.
Trakunyingcharoen, T., et al. "Botryosphaeriaceae associated with diseases of mango (Mangifera indica)." Australasian Plant Pathology 43.4 (2014): 425–438.

External links 
MycoBank

Botryosphaeriales
Dothideomycetes genera